Raiatea Airport (also known as Uturoa Airport) is an airport on Raiatea, French Polynesia. It is in the village of Uturoa. The airport was inaugurated in 1962, but did not see service in 1964. A backfilling was built on the north part of the island, as no appropriate site could be found on the coast. Many people use this airport to access the nearby island of Taha'a.

In 2014, 207,722 passengers used the airport.

Airlines and destinations

Statistics

References

Airports in French Polynesia